Midtown High School, formerly Henry W. Grady High School, is a public high school located in Atlanta, Georgia, United States. It began as Boys High School and was one of the first two high schools established by Atlanta Public Schools in 1872. In 1947, the school was named after Henry W. Grady, a journalist, orator in the Reconstruction Era, and a white supremacist. In December 2020, the Atlanta Board of Education announced the new name of Midtown which took effect June 1, 2021.

Midtown is located adjacent to Piedmont Park at 929 Charles Allen Drive, between 8th and 10th Streets, in Midtown Atlanta.

Areas served
In addition to Midtown Atlanta, the school serves Inman Park, Virginia-Highland, Poncey–Highland, Lake Claire, Candler Park, Old Fourth Ward, Morningside-Lenox Park, Home Park, Atlantic Station, Ansley Park, 10th and Home, the designated family housing unit of Georgia Tech, and parts of Downtown Atlanta.

Elementary schools feeding into Midtown High are: Centennial Place, Mary Lin, Hope-Hill, Morningside, and Springdale Park. The Samuel M. Inman Middle School also feeds into Midtown.

History

Initially known as Boys High School, it had a Technical Department which expanded in 1909 to become a separate school: Tech High. The "Henry W. Grady Senior High School for Boys" moved to the current campus site in 1924. The 1924 structure (the wing of the campus facing Charles Allen Dr.) still stands, and has been renovated three times (1950, 1987, and 2004). Between 1909 and 1924, Tech High also moved to the campus' current location. Tech High and Boys High merged in 1947 under the name Henry Woodfin Grady High School.

Grady served as the communication magnet in the Atlanta Public Schools system from 1991 until 2011, when the school closed the magnet following a system-wide grant from the Gates Foundation to open small learning communities. From 2011 to 2015, Grady was home to four small learning communities: Communications and Journalism, Public Policy and Justice, Business and Entrepreneurship, and Biomedical Science and Engineering. In 2015, Grady High School course offerings expanded to include the following pathways: Advanced Academic, World Languages, Fine Arts, Instrumental Music, Theatre Arts, Visual Arts, and Career, Technical and Agricultural Education (CTAE). In 2016–17, it was used during the production of the 2017 Marvel Studios film Spider-Man: Homecoming, which is set in the Marvel Cinematic Universe (MCU).

Controversy over name
In January 2016, Henry W. Grady Middle School in Houston was renamed because Grady was a white supremacist.

In February 2016, the school newspaper argued that Henry Grady's name should be removed from the school because he was a white supremacist.

In July 2020, the Atlanta Board of Education formed a committee to consider a new name. On December 15, 2020, the Board officially announced the name change to Midtown High School effective June 1, 2021.

Curriculum and activities

Arts

Knights of Sound
The school has a band, Knights of Sound Band (made of a marching band, a concert/symphonic band, and a jazz band).

Chorus
The school also has a chorus.

School publications

The Unmasking
The Unmasking literary magazine was founded in 1988 as a collection of student art, literature, and criticism edited by Midtown students, published every spring. The magazine was named "Best in Show" by the National Scholastic Press Association twice, in 2005 (Seattle) and 2001 (Boston).

The Southerner
The Southerner is a monthly newspaper written by Midtown students. Part of the High School National Ad Network, it has been published since 1947. The Southerner has won numerous awards, such as the Pacemaker Award and the Quill & Scroll Award, earning the publication nationwide acclaim.

GNN and Gametime
Grady News Now and Gametime were Midtown High School's programs in broadcast journalism, and are also recipients of many awards. GNN won its first Pacemaker in November 2005. Gametime is a weekly show dedicated to the coverage of prevalent sports stories as well as scores and highlights from all scholastic athletic events. It won the GSPA (Georgia Scholastic Press Association) award for the best new breakthrough production.

Nexus 
Nexus, written by Midtown students, was a bimonthly magazine. Its success in the 2004–2005 school year was at first limited, with only a handful of editions, as that was its first year and it started late. Its second year (2005–2006) saw great success when Nexus gained the Start-Up achievement award from the Georgia Scholastic Press Association. In the 2008–2009 school year Nexus won "All Southern" from SIPA.

Sports
As of the 2021–22 season.

Key:

 Fall sports
 Water polo - boys' and girls'; girls 3rd place in state, 2013 
 Cheerleading (2006 Regional Champions)
 Cross-country (boys: 2017 Regional Champions; 2017 APS city champions; 2005 Regional Champions; 2003 2nd at state; 2009 APS city champions, 2010 APS city champions, 2011 APS city champions; 2016 APS city champions, 2018 APS city champions, 2019 APS city champions, 2019 2nd at regionals; 2019 3rd at state; girls: 2017 Regional Champions; 2017 APS City Champions)
 Football – varsity and junior varsity (1953 State Champions, 2016 Regional Champions, 2014 Regional Champions, State Football Semi-Finals)
 Softball
 Volleyball
 Winter sports
 Swimming - girls 2014 City Champs, boys 2014 City 2nd Place
 Basketball – boys' and girls' varsity and JV (2006 Regional Champion Runner-up)
 Cheerleading (2006 Regional Champion)
 Debate – novice, JV and varsity (see below, under "Speech and Debate")
 Riflery – co-ed
 Spring sports
 Baseball – varsity and JV
 Golf
 Lacrosse - varsity (boys and girls)
 Soccer (boys: 2004, 2005 Regional Champions; girls: first state playoff win ever in 2006, Final Four in 2007) - Grady soccer teams compete in region 5-AAA.
 Tennis (varsity boys: 2017,2018, 2019 6AAAAA Region Champions, 2019 AAAAA State Runner Up)
 Track (girls, 1988 State Champions, 2013 Atlanta City Champions; boys, 2000, Team 3rd State Class AA, 2001, Team 3rd State Class AA, 2002 Team Region Runner-up,  2003, Team 3rd State Class AA, 2005, Team Class AA State Runner-up, 2007, State runner-up and nationally ranked 4x100 relay, 2011 Atlanta City Champions, 2012 Atlanta City Champions)
 Ultimate frisbee - boys' and girls' varsity and JV (2012, 2017, 2018, 2019 varsity Boys state champions, 2017 Varsity Boys Southeast-Region Champions, 2018 Varsity Boys National Champions)

Demographics of student body
As of October 2021, the school had 1,473 students.
 44% were African-American.
 42% were Caucasian.
 5% were Hispanic.
 7% were multiracial.
 8% were Asian.

In popular culture
Several rap videos have been shot on campus, including videos by popular artists Dem Franchize Boyz, Freak Nasty, and Outkast. In 2011, the campus hosted MTV's hit show Teen Wolf as it made its television debut. Several movies have been shot on campus, including Remember the Titans, Ride Along, The Duff, Love, Simon, and Spider-Man: Homecoming.

Notable alumni
The following are notable alumni of Boys High (pre-1947), Henry W. Grady High (1947-2021) or Midtown High (2021-present), listed with their graduating class and notable accomplishments:

Ivan Allen Jr. (1929) Mayor of Atlanta
Jim Bagby, Jr. (1935) Former professional baseball player for the Boston Red Sox, Cleveland Indians, and Pittsburgh Pirates
Charles Alvin Beckwith (1947) Special Forces officer credited with founding Delta Force
Red Borom (1935) former professional baseball player for the Detroit Tigers
Hugh Casey (1932) Former professional baseball player for the Chicago Cubs, Brooklyn Dodgers, Pittsburgh Pirates, and New York Yankees
S. Truett Cathy (1939) Chick-fil-A founder (Boys High)
Josie Duffy Rice (2005) Former President of The Appeal and a writer and criminal justice expert.
Danielle Deadwyler (2000) Actress and writer known for her roles in Atlanta, The Haves and the Have Nots, Station Eleven, The Harder They Fall and the upcoming Till.
Stuart Eizenstat (1960) Policy advisor for the Carter and Clinton presidential administrations
Harris Hines (1961) Chief Justice, State of Georgia Supreme Court
Franklin Garrett (1924) Historian of Atlanta
Lorenza Izzo (2008) Actress and model
Yolanda King (1972) Daughter of Martin Luther King Jr.
Elliott Levitas (1948) Former U.S. Congressman
Marty Marion (1936) Former professional baseball player for the St. Louis Cardinals and St. Louis Browns; former manager for the St. Louis Cardinals, St. Louis Browns, and Chicago White Sox)
Earthwind Moreland (1995) Professional football player for the New England Patriots
Nolen Richardson Former professional baseball player for the Detroit Tigers, New York Yankees, and Cincinnati Reds
Eric Roberts (1974) Academy Award-nominated actor
Dean Rusk (1924) Secretary of State from 1961 to 1969
Adam Schultz (2002) Chief Official White House Photographer from 2021-present
John M. Slaton (1880) Governor of Georgia from 1913 to 1915
Supreeme Former hip-hop group whose members include Shaka "Tom Cruz" Girvan aka Dope Pope, Negashi Armada, and Sam "King Self" Terrell
Faye Webster (2015) Musician
Allen West (1979)  C/LTC of the 1979 ROTC class, US Congressman from Florida
Donald Windham (1937) Playwright, editor, novelist, short-story writer, and memoirist; known for such works as The Dog Star, Emblems of Conduct, The Warm Country, and Two People; grew up on Peachtree Street
Bronte Woodard (1958) Wrote and adapted screenplay for the movie Grease
George W. Woodruff (1913) Former Director of Coca-Cola Company, philanthropist
Damian Swann (2011) Professional football player for the New Orleans Saints

References

External links

Midtown High School

Atlanta Public Schools high schools
Magnet schools in Georgia (U.S. state)
Educational institutions established in 1872
1872 establishments in Georgia (U.S. state)